Sokolsky District is the name of several administrative and municipal districts in Russia:
Sokolsky District, Nizhny Novgorod Oblast, an administrative district of Nizhny Novgorod Oblast
Sokolsky District, Vologda Oblast, an administrative and municipal district of Vologda Oblast

See also
Sokolsky (disambiguation)

References